Benjamin Matthew Godfrey (born 15 January 1998) is an English professional footballer who plays as a centre-back for  club Everton and the England national team.

Early and personal life
Godfrey was born in York, North Yorkshire, and attended Archbishop Holgate's School. His father Alex Godfrey is a former professional rugby league footballer. Godfrey is of Jamaican descent through his paternal grandfather.

Club career

Early career

Godfrey captained the York & District under-13 team that beat Southampton at Stadium MK in the final of the English Schools' FA Inter-Association Trophy in May 2011. This was the first time a team from York had won an English Schools' FA competition. He started his career with York City's youth system, before moving to Middlesbrough in the summer of 2011. After being released by the club, he had trials with Leeds United and Sheffield Wednesday, before returning to York at under-15 level, with whom he started his scholarship. Godfrey captained York's under-18 team in the 2014–15 season, while still a first-year scholar. His first involvement with the first team came as an unused substitute in a League Two match against Newport County on 11 October 2014. Godfrey made his debut aged 17 when starting York's 1–0 home win over Yeovil Town on 18 August 2015. He scored his first goal for York in the eighth minute of stoppage time in a 2–1 home loss to Plymouth Argyle on 14 November 2015 with a shot from 10 yards.

Norwich City
Godfrey signed for Premier League club Norwich City on 15 January 2016 on a three-and-a-half-year contract for an undisclosed fee and would initially play in their academy team. He made his debut on 23 August as a substitute in the 65th minute of Norwich's EFL Cup second round match against Coventry City and scored in the 87th minute of a 6–1 home win with a shot from outside the penalty area. Godfrey made his league debut in a 2–0 home win over Birmingham City on 28 January 2017 as an 81st-minute substitute. He signed a new four-year contract with Norwich on 11 August 2017, keeping him at the club until the summer of 2021.

On 24 August 2017, Godfrey joined League One club Shrewsbury Town on loan until 1 January 2018. The deal was later extended to the end of the season.

For the 2018–19 season, Godfrey was back with Norwich. He played in their four EFL Cup games but his appearances in the league were limited to substitute appearances until December: With Grant Hanley and Timm Klose both injured, Godfrey made his first league start for Norwich in the Championship match against Bolton Wanderers, partnering Christoph Zimmermann at centre half in a 3–2 win. He remained in the side even when Hanley was fit again and scored his first goal for Norwich at the end of the year to give them an early lead against Derby County, although a late comeback from Derby saw Norwich lose the game 4–3. This was only a temporary setback for both Godfrey and Norwich however. Godfrey would score three more goals, all of which would earn Norwich points as they chased promotion back to the Premier League. This was achieved in the penultimate game, a 2–1 win over Blackburn Rovers, with Godfrey in the team. In all, Godfrey played 31 league games during the season, starting 26 of them.

Godfrey made his first Premier League appearance in the opening game of the 2019–20 season, a 4–1 defeat against Liverpool, playing alongside Hanley. There were again a number of injuries to centre halves throughout the season, to the point that Godfrey was the only fit regular centre back at one point, and even captained the side with Hanley, Alexander Tettey, Klose and Zimmermann all injured. After a promising start winning two of their first five games, Norwich soon slid to the bottom of the table. When they did record a rare win against fellow strugglers AFC Bournemouth, Godfrey was sent off in the second half for a late challenge on Callum Wilson, having the unfortunate distinction of being the first Premier League player to be dismissed as a result of a referee consulting a VAR monitor. Godfrey again made 30 league appearances for Norwich but, in a season disrupted by a three-month suspension during the 2020 COVID-19 pandemic, the club were relegated back to the Championship.

Godfrey would play in Norwich's first three games in the 2020–21 season, making his last appearance in a 1–0 defeat by Bournemouth.

Everton

Godfrey signed for Premier League club Everton on 5 October 2020 on a five-year contract for an undisclosed fee, reported by The Athletic to be an initial £20 million, potentially rising to £25 million in add-ons. He made his debut on 17 October in a Merseyside derby against Liverpool in a 2–2 draw at home in the Premier League, coming on as a 31st-minute substitute after an injury to Séamus Coleman. Adam Jones of the Liverpool Echo said that Godfrey "was thrown into the deep end for his debut and stood up to the task very well".

At the end of his first season at the club, Godfrey was voted by Everton fans as the club's Young Player of the Season.

International career
Godfrey received his first call-up for the England national under-20 team ahead of their 2018–19 Under 20 Elite League fixtures against Poland and Portugal in March 2019. He made his debut when starting in the 3–1 defeat at home to Poland. He made two appearances for the under-20s.

Godfrey was included in the England national under-21 team for the first time for their 2021 UEFA European Under-21 Championship qualification matches against Turkey and Kosovo in September 2019. He made his debut as an 81st-minute substitute during a 3–2 away win against Turkey on 6 September. He started the following match as captain, as England beat Kosovo 2–0 at home. Godfrey scored his first international goal on 8 September 2020 in a 2–1 away win against Austria in 2021 UEFA European Under-21 Championship qualification with a sliding finish after a well-timed run.

On 25 May 2021, Godfrey was called up as part of Gareth Southgate's 33-man provisional England squad for the delayed UEFA Euro 2020. He was not named in the final 26-man squad, with Southgate stating that Godfrey was part of the provisional squad "in order to gain experience". However, he remained in the squad for England's pre-tournament friendlies against Austria and Romania at the Riverside Stadium and made his debut on 2 June as a 61st-minute substitute as England beat Austria 1–0. He made his first start four days later, playing the entirety of a 1–0 win over Romania.

Style of play
Godfrey primarily plays as a centre-back, but also played in central midfield and at full-back in his early career.

Career statistics

Club

International

Honours
Shrewsbury Town
EFL Trophy runner-up: 2017–18

Norwich City
EFL Championship: 2018–19

Individual
Everton Young Player of the Season: 2020–21

References
Infobox statistics
England U20: 
England U21: 

Specific

External links

Profile at the Everton F.C. website
Profile at the Football Association website

1998 births
Living people
Footballers from York
English footballers
England youth international footballers
England under-21 international footballers
England international footballers
Association football defenders
York City F.C. players
Middlesbrough F.C. players
Norwich City F.C. players
Shrewsbury Town F.C. players
Everton F.C. players
English Football League players
Premier League players
People educated at Archbishop Holgate's School
English people of Jamaican descent